Latenivenatrix (meaning "hiding huntress") is a genus of troodontid known from one species, L. mcmasterae. Along with the contemporary Stenonychosaurus, it is known from the non-tooth fossils formerly assigned to the genus Troodon. Although described as separate, it has been considered a junior synonym of Stenonychosaurus.

Discovery and specimens
The type specimen or holotype of Latenivenatrix, CMN 12340, was originally described in 1969 by Dale Alan Russell and referred by him to the genus Stenonychosaurus. In 1987 it was referred to Troodon. It had been collected in 1968 by Irene Vanderloh in the Dinosaur Park Formation strata from Alberta, southern Canada. The specimen has preserved some skull bones (frontals, parietals, postorbital, basioccipital and basisphenoid), four vertebrae and four ribs, some chevrons and gastralia, fairly complete forelimb and incomplete hindlimbs.

Moreover, three additional specimens coming from the same locality are referred to the same species. These include UALVP 55804 (a partial pelvis), TMP 1982.019.0023 (a partial skull), and TMP 1992.036.575 (a right dentary and several left metatarsals).

Latenivenatrix was suggested to be distinguishable from Stenonychosaurus due to the structure of its frontals and metatarsal III, although later analyses found these characters to be individually variable, and also present in specimens of Stenonychosaurus.

Description

It was described as distinguishable from other troodontids thanks to the following diagnostic (autapomorphic) traits residing in the pelvis: the pubis is retroverted forming a 17° angle; the pubic shaft is anteriorly curved; a large muscle scar on the lateral surface of the pubic shaft is present, slightly proximal to the pubic boot (this is seen also in dromaeosaurid Hesperonychus). 

Other traits argued to further distinguish Latenivenatrix from other derived troodontids (particularly its close relative Stenonychosaurus) are: the triangular shape of each frontal bone which also does have a single deep groove in the frontonasal contact surface; a concave anterior surface of metatarsal III. While this trait appears to be absent in other derived troodontids such as Saurornithoides, Talos, and Urbacodon, it appears to be present in Philovenator as well and not clearly verifiable in several species. 

A later re-analysis of the stratigraphic positions of known specimens of Latenivenatrix and Stenonychosaurus (including specimens not included in the initial description of L. mcmasterae) also found stratigraphic overlap between the two proposed taxa. Due to this stratigraphic overlap, as well as the lack of definitive diagnostic characters, the variable presence of characters originally described as autapomorphic of Latenivenatrix in specimens of Stenonychosaurus, and the extensive overlap of frontals of both in morphospace, L. mcmasterae was considered to be a junior synonym of S. inequalis.

Phylogeny

Latenivenatrix was found to be a derived troodontid (part of the newly defined Troodontinae), probably related to coeval Asian forms such as Linhevenator and Philovenator.

Paleobiology
Latenivenatrix was the largest troodontid known, with a maximum total body length estimated to 3.5 m (11.5 ft). As a derived troodontid, it was probably a semi-omnivorous bipedal with loss of the skills of a primitive flyer.

Paleopathology

A parietal bone catalogued as TMP 79.8.1 bears a "pathological aperture". In 1985 Phil Currie hypothesized that this aperture was caused by a cyst, but in 1999 Tanke and Rothschild interpreted it as a possible bite wound. One hatchling specimen may have suffered from a congenital defect resulting in the front part of its jaw being twisted.

See also
 Timeline of troodontid research
2017 in archosaur paleontology

References 

Troodontids
Late Cretaceous dinosaurs of North America
Fossil taxa described in 2017